Dobbs is an English surname. Notable people with the surname include:

 Alfred Dobbs (1882–1945), British politician and trade unionist
 Amanda Dobbs (born 1993), American figure skater
 Arthur Dobbs (1689–1765), Anglo-Irish politician, colonial governor of North Carolina 1754–1765
 Arthur Frederick Dobbs (1876–1955), Irish politician
 Betty Jo Teeter Dobbs (1930–1994), American historian specializing in Isaac Newton's occult studies
 Bobby Dobbs (1922–1986), American footballer
 Catherine Dobbs (1908–1974), first woman mayor of a major U.S. industrial city, Barberton, Ohio
 Demarcus Dobbs (born 1987), American footballer
 Farrell Dobbs (1907–1983), American Trotskyist and trade unionist
 Francis Dobbs (1750–1811), Irish barrister, politician and writer
 Frank Q. Dobbs (1939–2006), American screenwriter, film director, film producer and cinematographer
 Gerald Dobbs (born 1971), retired English footballer
 Glenn Dobbs (1920–2002), American footballer
 Greg Dobbs (born 1978), American Baseball Player
 Greg Dobbs (journalist), American TV journalist
 Harold Dobbs (1918–1994), civic leader and politician in San Francisco, California
 Harriet Dobbs (1808–1887), Irish-Canadian charity worker
 Sir Henry Dobbs (1871–1934), administrator in British India and High Commissioner in Iraq
 Hoyt McWhorter Dobbs (1878–1954), American Methodist Bishop
 John Dobbs (1875–1934), American baseball player
 John Wesley Dobbs (1882–1961), African American civic and political leader
 Joshua Dobbs (born 1995), American football player
 Kildare Dobbs (1923–2013), Canadian short story and travel writer
 Lem Dobbs (born 1959), British-American screenwriter
 Dame Linda Dobbs (born 1951), the first non-white judge in England and Wales
 Lou Dobbs (born 1945), American journalist, radio and TV host
 Mattiwilda Dobbs (1925–2015), African-American coloratura soprano
 Michael Dobbs (born 1948), British politician and author
 Michael Dobbs (US author) (born 1950), Anglo-American non-fiction author
 Nigel Dobbs (born 1962), former English cricketer
 Paul Dobbs (1970–2010), New Zealand motorcycle road racer
 Quail Dobbs (1941–2014), American rodeo clown and performer
 Ricky Dobbs (born 1988), United States Navy officer and former college football quarterback
 Roland Dobbs (1924–2016), British physicist
 Samuel Candler Dobbs (1868–1950), president and chairman of The Coca-Cola Company 1919–1922

Fictional characters 
 Dobbs, pilot in Catch-22
 Elizabeth Gail Dobbs, character in Christian children's books by Hilda Stahl
 Hannibal Dobbs, character played by James Hampton (actor) in the TV Series F Troop
 J. R. "Bob" Dobbs, figurehead of the Church of the SubGenius
 Jackie Dobbs, character in British TV soap opera Coronation Street
 Maisie Dobbs, character in novels by Jacqueline Winspear
 Molly Dobbs, character in British TV soap opera Coronation Street
 Phyllis Dobbs, character in BBC One's science fiction/police procedural drama Life on Mars
 Tyrone Dobbs, character in British TV soap opera Coronation Street
 Fred C. Dobbs, character played by Humphrey Bogart in the film The Treasure of the Sierra Madre
 Fred C. Dobbs, character played by satirist Michael Magee

References 

English-language surnames
Patronymic surnames
Surnames from given names